The Brotherhood of St Laurence is an Australian not-for-profit organisation working toward an Australia free of poverty. The Brotherhood (as it is colloquially known) has its headquarters in Melbourne but provides services and programs across Australia. It undertakes research, delivers services and advocates for anyone who faces, or is at risk of, disadvantage and poverty.

The Brotherhood pursues systemic change and finds new ways to address disadvantage so that people can fully participate in economic, social and civic life, and create and share prosperity with dignity and respect.

Programs and Services 
The Brotherhood’s five-year strategy for 2019–2023 aimed to directly build the capability of over 150,000 people who experience disadvantage, through community programs, disability and aged care services so that community members can find sustainable pathways out of poverty.

The Strategy has five goals:

 Economic security for all
 Wellbeing, social inclusion, empowerment and dignity for all
 Inclusive services and communities
 A trusted voice nationally on poverty and disadvantage
 An inclusive, effective, efficient and agile organisation

The Brotherhood's broad portfolio of programs and services create lasting change in the community. Initiatives support disadvantaged people of all ages to build better lives for themselves. It develops innovative place-based services that are often then scaled up and adopted by other community organisations and local, state and federal governments.

Programs and services focus on

children and families – in the early years, both at home and in school
young people – moving through secondary school and into work or further education
adults – seeking employment and training
older people – facing the challenges of retirement and ageing.
people living with disability

Within this broad framework, the Brotherhood pays particular attention to issues relating to refugees and settlement, financial inclusion and social inclusion.

History and beginnings

It was founded on 8 December 1930 in the Anglican parish church of St Stephen in Adamstown, Newcastle in New South Wales. Its founder, Father Gerard Kennedy Tucker, dreamed of building a dedicated group of like-minded people who would serve the church and the community. The Brotherhood was established as a religious order of the Anglican Church, with members including priests and lay brothers.

In 1933, the Brotherhood of St Laurence accepted the invitation of Canon Maynard of St Peter's, Eastern Hill, Melbourne (with the approval of the Archbishop of Melbourne) and moved to St Mary's Mission in Fitzroy to help people living in poverty in that neighbourhood. Young men who wished to serve others in the name of Christ came together as a community at St Mary's and attended lectures at St Peter's. They lived simply, studied, prayed and helped with social welfare activities.

At the height of the Great Depression, when some 30% of the workforce was jobless, the Brotherhood became more actively involved in helping unemployed people and their families. After the 1939–45 War, there was little interest in expanding the Brotherhood as a religious order. However, the welfare work of the Brotherhood continued and expanded under Father Tucker's leadership. He believed that the role of the organisation was to provide a 'fence at the top of the cliff rather than ambulances at the bottom,’ and he deployed a range of clever tactics to achieve social change including producing films, public campaigns, letters to newspapers and other advocacy. The Brotherhood’s tradition of exploring new ways to address disadvantage through innovation, research, partnerships and advocacy continues to this day.

Research and policy

The Brotherhood has a strong reputation for its research expertise and influence and its Research and Policy Centre (RPC) is the largest and oldest social policy research centre in a non-government welfare organisation in Australia. The team conducts timely research on the causes, consequences and measurement of poverty, inequality and socioeconomic disadvantage.  The Brotherhood’s research standing is strengthened through a longstanding partnership with the University of Melbourne. They also house a library and collaborate with other researchers, government agencies and community organisations.

Research areas include

 inclusive education
 work and economic security
 inclusive ageing
 energy, equity and climate change
 housing and communities
 poverty and social exclusion

National Disability Insurance Scheme Local Area Coordination 
The Brotherhood provides Local Area Coordination in North East Metropolitan Melbourne, Hume Moreland, Bayside Peninsula, Western Melbourne and Brimbank Melton areas. This includes supporting people with disability to access community and mainstream services and resources and supporting people who meet the NDIS access requirements to navigate and engage effectively with the NDIS.

Social enterprises 

The Brotherhood has 22 community stores (also known as op-shops) across greater Melbourne and Geelong where it sells donated furniture, clothing and other household items. As well as selling low-cost goods to families and bargain hunters, the organisation offers volunteer opportunities and a place for community connection. Among the Brotherhood's community stores, are three Hunter Gatherer shops specialise in selling hand-picked vintage clothing, accessories and bric-a-brac.

Brotherhood Books is Australia's only online charity second-hand bookstore stocking a wide range of popular books, rare and collectable titles and children's books.

Staff and Volunteers 
The Brotherhood employs 1400 staff and has 1200 volunteers across the organisation

Governance 
The Brotherhood of St Laurence is incorporated under the Brotherhood of St Laurence (Incorporation) Act 1971, number 8188 of the Victorian Parliament, and is domiciled in Australia. The registered office is at 67 Brunswick Street, Fitzroy, Victoria 3065. The Brotherhood is an income tax-exempt charity, has deductible gift recipient status and is registered with the Australian Charities and Not-for-profits Commission. Lady Southey AC is Patron of the Brotherhood. The President of the Brotherhood is the Most Revd Dr Philip Freier, Anglican Archbishop of Melbourne and the Anglican Primate of Australia. The 13-member Board of Directors meets monthly.

Partnerships and Corporate support 
The Brotherhood provides corporate volunteering and donation opportunities and has a range of partnerships with charities as well as businesses (e.g. ANZ bank) and councils (e.g. Yarra City Council).

References

External links 

Brotherhood of St Laurence website

Organisations based in Melbourne
Christian organizations established in the 20th century
Non-profit organisations based in Victoria (Australia)
Charity shops